The 2021 Argentine Primera Nacional, also known as the Campeonato de Primera Nacional 2021, was the 37th season of the Primera Nacional, the second tier of Argentine football. The season began on 12 March 2021 and ended on 21 December 2021. Thirty-five teams competed in the league, thirty returning from the 2020 season, two teams promoted from Torneo Federal A and three from Primera B Metropolitana.

Tigre were the champions, winning their first Primera Nacional title by beating Barracas Central by a 1–0 score in the final played on 22 November 2021 and earned promotion to the Argentine Primera División.

Format
The 35 teams were split into two zones, one of 17 teams and another one of 18 teams, where they played against the other teams in their group twice: once at home and once away, with one team in Zone A having a bye in each round for a total of 34 rounds. Both zone winners played a final match on neutral ground to decide the first promoted team to the Liga Profesional for the 2022 season, while the teams placed from second to fourth place in each zone played a knockout tournament (Torneo Reducido) for the second promotion berth along with the loser of the final between the zone winners, which joined the Reducido in the semi-finals. No teams were relegated to either Primera B Metropolitana or Torneo Federal A this season. The draw to decide the groups and fixture was held on 25 February 2021.

Club information

Stadia and locations

Zone A

Standings

Results

Zone B

Standings

Results

Final
The top-ranked teams of each zone played a match on neutral ground to decide the champions and the first team promoted to Primera División. The losing team advanced to the semi-finals of the Torneo Reducido.

Torneo Reducido

First round

|}

First leg

Second leg

Semi-finals
The semi-finals were contested by the three winners from the previous stage, as well as the Final losers Barracas Central. In this round, the four teams were seeded according to their performance in the first stage of the competition, with the best-ranked teams being paired against the worst ranked ones in double-legged ties. The two winners advanced to the final.

|}

First leg

Second leg

Final
The semi-final winners played a match on neutral ground to decide the second team promoted to Primera División.

Copa Argentina qualification
Fifteen Primera Nacional teams qualified for the round of 32 of the 2021–22 Copa Argentina, which were the top seven teams of each zone at the end of the season and the best eighth-placed team, which was selected according to points earned per game, goal difference, and goals scored.

Ranking of eighth-placed teams

Season statistics

Top scorers
{| class="wikitable" style="text-align:center"
|-
!Rank
!Player
!Club
!Goals
|-
|1
|align="left"| Pablo Magnín
|align="left"|Tigre
|22
|-
|2
|align="left"| Pablo Vegetti
|align="left"|Belgrano
|17
|-
|3
|align="left"| Facundo Bruera
|align="left"|Brown
|15
|-
|4
|align="left"| Brian Fernández
|align="left"|Ferro Carril Oeste
|14
|-
|rowspan=2|5
|align="left"| Nicolás Servetto
|align="left"|Almagro
|rowspan=2|13
|-
|align="left"| Claudio Bieler
|align="left"|Atlético de Rafaela
|-
|7
|align="left"| Facundo Suárez
|align="left"|Gimnasia y Esgrima (J)
|12
|-
|rowspan=2|8
|align="left"| Axel Rodríguez
|align="left"|All Boys
|rowspan=2|11
|-
|align="left"| Felipe Cadenazzi
|align="left"|Alvarado
|-
|rowspan=5|10
|align="left"| Santiago Vera
|align="left"|Almirante Brown
|rowspan=5|10
|-
|align="left"| Ignacio Colombini
|align="left"|Atlanta
|-
|align="left"| Tomás Molina
|align="left"|Ferro Carril Oeste
|-
|align="left"| Diego Cardozo
|align="left"|Independiente Rivadavia
|-
|align="left"| Ezequiel Cérica
|align="left"|Mitre (SdE)
|}

See also
 2021 Argentine Primera División
 2021 Torneo Federal A
 2021 Primera B Metropolitana
 2019–20 Copa Argentina

References

External links
 Ascenso del Interior  
 Interior Futbolero 
 Promiedos  

Primera B Nacional seasons
2021 in Argentine football